Katarína Košlabová (born 27 November 1998) is a Slovak footballer who plays as a midfielder and has appeared for the Slovakia women's national team.

Career
Košlabová has been capped for the Slovakia national team, appearing for the team during the 2019 FIFA Women's World Cup qualifying cycle.

References

External links
 
 
 

1998 births
Living people
Slovak women's footballers
Slovakia women's international footballers
Women's association football midfielders
FC Nitra players